The Three Lords and Nine Ministers system was a central administrative system adopted in ancient China that was officially instituted in the Qin dynasty (221 BC – 206 BC) and was replaced by the Three Departments and Six Ministries  system since the Sui dynasty (AD 589–618).

Divisions

Three Lords 

Three Lords referred to three highest rank officials in the imperial government, namely:
 the Chancellor (丞相) 
 the Imperial Secretary (御史大夫) 
 the Grand Commandant (太尉)

Nine Ministers 

Nine Ministers comprised all the ministers of importance in the central government. They were: 
 the Minister of Ceremonies (太常, formally known as 奉常) 
 the Supervisor of Attendants (光祿勛, formally known as 郎中令) 
 the Commandant of Guards (衛尉) 
 the Minister of Coachmen (太僕) 
 the Commandant of Justice (廷尉) 
 the Grand Herald (大鴻臚, formally known as 典客 or 大行令) 
 the Director of the Imperial Clan (宗正) 
 the Grand Minister of Agriculture (大司農, formally known as 治粟內史) 
 the Small Treasurer (少府)

See also 
 Five Directorates
 Government of the Han dynasty
 Nine Courts
 Political systems of Imperial China

References

Citations

Sources 

 
 
 

Government of Imperial China